The following is a list of notable clinical studies of menopausal hormone therapy (estrogen and/or progestogen therapy) in women, including randomized controlled trials and observational studies.

Randomized controlled trials
 Clinical Study on Hormone Dose Optimisation in Climacteric Symptoms Evaluation (CHOICE)
 Comparative Effect on Bone Density, Endometrium, and Lipids of Continuous Hormones as Replacement Therapy (CHART)
 Danish Osteoporosis Prevention Study (DOPS) (open-label)
 Early versus Late Intervention Trial with Estradiol (ELITE)
 Estrogen in Prevention of Atherosclerosis Trial (EPAT)
 Estrogen Replacement and Atherosclerosis (ERA)
 Estrogen in Venous Thromboembolism Trial (EVTET)
 Heart and Estrogen/Progestin Replacement Study (HERS)
 Hormone replacement therapy After Breast cancer — Is iT Safe? (HABITS)
 Kronos Early Estrogen Prevention Study (KEEPS)
 Papworth HRT Atherosclerosis Study (PHASE)
 Perimenopausal Estrogen Replacement Therapy Study (PERT)
 Postmenopausal Estrogen/Progestin Interventions (PEPI)
 Stockholm Trial or Stockholm Randomized Trial
 Women's Estrogen for Stroke Trial (WEST)
 Women's Estrogen Lipid-Lowering Hormone Atherosclerosis Regression Trial (WELL-HART)
 Women's Health Initiative Estrogen Study (WHI-E)
 Women's Health Initiative Estrogen + Progestin Study (WHI-EP)
 Women's Health, Osteoporosis, Progestin, Estrogen (Women's HOPE)
 Women's International Study of Long-Duration Oestrogen After Menopause (WISDOM)

Observational studies
 CECILE (French study)
 Combined Cohorts of Menopausal Women, studies of Register Based Health Outcomes in Relation to Hormonal Drugs (COMPREHEND)
 Estrogen and Thromboembolism Risk (ESTHER)
 European Prospective Investigation into Cancer and Nutrition (EPIC)
 French cohort: Etude Epidémiologique auprès de femmes de l'Education National (E3N, E3N-EPIC)
 Framingham Heart Study (FHS)
 Menopause, Estrogen and Venous Events (MEVE)
 Menopause: Risk of Breast Cancer, Morbidity and Prevalence (MISSION)
 Million Women Study (MWS)
 Nurses' Health Study (NHS)
 Study of NorpregnAnes on Coagulation (SNAC)
 Women's Health Initiative Observational Study (WHI-OS)

See also
 List of clinical studies of hormonal birth control

References

Clinical trials
Endocrinology